Huangfengqiao Town is an urban town in You County, Hunan Province, People's Republic of China.

Cityscape
The town is divided into 13 villages and one community, the following areas: Huliping Community, Yantang Village, Dongyueshan Village, Fenglong Village, Wanxinqiao Village, Jilinqiao Village, Shilian Village, Manjiang Village, Xiaoshu Village, Taqian Village, Baoning Village, Yangfeng Village, Damiao Village, and Sanguang Village.

References

External links

Divisions of You County